Nigeria has competed at fourteen Commonwealth Games, from 1950. Nigeria did not attend four Games, in 1962, 1978 (in protest at New Zealand's sporting policies towards South Africa during apartheid), 1986 and 1998 (due to suspension).

Nigeria has won at least one medal at every Games attended, including a high of thirty-seven in 1994. The first medal in 1950 was won by Joshua Majekodunmi in the High Jump.

Medals

References

 

https://www.premiumtimesng.com/news/headlines/547523-commonwealth-games-nigerias-12-gold-medals-all-won-by-women-full-list.html